Saint-Malo-de-Guersac is a commune in the Loire-Atlantique department in western France. It was created in 1925 from part of the commune of Montoir-de-Bretagne.

See also
Communes of the Loire-Atlantique department
Parc naturel régional de Brière

References

External links

 Saint-Malo-de-Guersac official website

Saintmalodeguersac